Naga Nandhini is a 1961 Indian Tamil language film directed by G. R. Nathan. The film stars Anjali Devi, K. Balaji and Devika. It was released on 10 February 1961.

Plot

Cast 
The following list is adapted from the book Thiraikalanjiyam Part-2.

Male cast
K. Balaji
M. N. Nambiar
P. S. Veerappa
K. R. Ramsingh
Ramdas
V. R. Rajagopal
Narayanasamy
Karikol Raj

Female cast
Anjali Devi
Devika
Sandhya
Rajakumari
Ramamani Bai
Thilagam

Production 
The film was produced by B. ValliNayagam under his own banner B. V. N. Productions and was directed by G. R. Nathan who also handled the cinematography. A. Natarajan was the operative cameraman while special effects were handled by Harban Singh. Art direction was done by P. Angamuthu and M. Azhagappan while the stunt was managed by Shyam Sundar. Thangappan was in charge of choreography.
Still photography was done by P. K. Nataraj. The film was shot at AVM, Golden and Shyamala Studios. Processing was done by T. Jegatheesan at Madras Cine Laboratory and Eastman Colour was done at Gemini Colour lab.

Soundtrack 
Music was composed by R. Sudarsanam and the lyrics were penned by Thanjai N. Ramaiah Dass, Sundara Kannan and M. K. Athmanathan.

References

External links 

1960s Tamil-language films